Country Sunshine may refer to:
 "Country Sunshine" (song), a country song written by Dottie West in 1973
 Country Sunshine (Dottie West album), 1973
 Country Sunshine (Bruce Robison album), 2001
 Country Sunshine With Myrna Lorrie, a Canadian country music television miniseries